Patliputra Natya Mahotsav (PNM), started in 1985, is an annual theatre festival organized in the Patna, India by the Prangan, a Cultural Organization, with the help of Union and state ministries of culture. held annually (usually in the February or march) at the Kalidas Rangalaya. The first Patliputra Natya Mahotsav was held in 1985 and 2023 was its 37th edition.

See also
Rajgir Mahotsav
Sonepur Cattle Fair
Patna Sahib Mahotsav

References

External links
Official website of Prangan

Festivals in Bihar
Culture of Patna
Festivals established in 1985
1985 establishments in Bihar
Theatre festivals in India